Marius Naydenov (born 10 July 1994) is a Bulgarian footballer who last played for Haskovo as a midfielder.

Club

References

External links
 
 Profile at Sportal

1994 births
Living people
Bulgarian footballers
FC Haskovo players
First Professional Football League (Bulgaria) players
Association football midfielders
People from Haskovo
Sportspeople from Haskovo Province